SMS V191 was a S-138-class large torpedo boat of the Imperial German Navy. She was built by the AG Vulcan shipyard at Stettin between 1910 and 1911 and launched on 2 June 1911.

V191 took part the First World War. She was present at the Battle of Heligoland Bight in August 1914. She was sunk when she struck a Russian mine in the Baltic on 17 December 1915

Construction and design
The Imperial German Navy ordered 12 large torpedo boats (Große Torpedoboote) as part of the fiscal year 1910 shipbuilding programme, with one half-flotilla of six ships (V186–V191) ordered from AG Vulcan and the other six ships from Germaniawerft. The two groups of torpedo boats were of basically similar layout but differed slightly in detailed design, with a gradual evolution of design and increase in displacement with each year's orders.

The ship was armed with two 8.8 cm L/45 guns, one on the Forecastle and one aft. Four single 50 cm (19.7 in) torpedo tubes were fitted, with two on the ship's beam in the gap between the forecastle and the ship's bridge which were capable of firing straight ahead, one between the ship's two funnels, and one aft of the funnels. The ship had a crew of 84 officers and men.

V191 was laid down at AG Vulcan's Stettin shipyard as Yard number 309 and was launched on 2 June 1911 and completed on 28 September 1911.

Service

First World War

On 28 August 1914, the  British Harwich Force, supported by light cruisers and battlecruisers of the Grand Fleet, carried out  a raid towards Heligoland with the intention of destroying patrolling German torpedo boats. Four German light cruisers and another flotilla of torpedo boats (V Torpedo Boat Flotilla) was in the vicinity of Heligoland. V191 , a member of the 1st Half Flotilla of I Torpedo Boat Flotilla, formed part of the outer screen of torpedo boats. At about 06:00 on 28 August, another member of the outer screen reported spotting the periscope of a submarine. As a result, the 5th Torpedo Boat Flotilla was ordered out to hunt the hostile submarine. At 07:57 G194 was fired on by British warships, and was soon retreating towards Heligoland, pursued by four British destroyers. V191 managed to successfully avoid the British ships and returned to base. However, sister ship , leader of I Flotilla, ran into the midst of the Harwich force when trying to return to Heligoland and was sunk.

In August 1915 the Germans detached a large portion of the High Seas Fleet for operations in the Gulf of Riga in support of the advance of German troops. It was planned to enter the Gulf via the Irben Strait, defeating any Russian naval forces and mining the entrance to Moon Sound. The torpedo boats of I Flotilla, including V191 was deployed in support of these operations, with V191,  and  encountering and exchanging fire with the large Russian destroyer  and two smaller destroyers of the Emir Bukharski-class on 11 August. On 17 December 1915, V191 and the light cruiser  were sunk in a minefield between Windau (now Ventspils, Latvia) and Lyserot. 25 of V191s crew were killed.

References

Torpedo boats of the Imperial German Navy
World War I torpedo boats of Germany
Ships built in Stettin
1911 ships